Alexandre Kaleka (born 6 March 1987) is a French professional golfer.

Kaleka turned professional in July 2009 and won his first tournament as a professional, the Allianz EurOpen de Lyon on the Challenge Tour. The win gave him a full exemption on the Challenge Tour in 2010, where a consistent season saw him finish in 20th place on the Order of Merit, giving him the final available European Tour card for 2011. He further improved his status at the end-of-year qualifying school. He struggled in his rookie year on the European Tour, making only 10 of 27 cuts while finishing 159th on the Order of Merit. His best result came at the Irish Open where he finished in fifth. Kaleka returned to the Challenge Tour in 2012. In September, he won the M2M Russian Challenge Cup.

Professional wins (3)

Challenge Tour wins (2)

Challenge Tour playoff record (0–1)

Pro Golf Tour wins (1)

Team appearances
Amateur
European Boys' Team Championship (representing France): 2004, 2005
European Youths' Team Championship (representing France): 2006
European Amateur Team Championship (representing France): 2007, 2008, 2009
Eisenhower Trophy (representing France): 2008
St Andrews Trophy (representing the Continent of Europe): 2008
Bonallack Trophy (representing Europe): 2008 (winners)

See also
2010 Challenge Tour graduates
2010 European Tour Qualifying School graduates
2012 Challenge Tour graduates

References

External links

French male golfers
European Tour golfers
Golfers from Paris
1987 births
Living people
21st-century French people